Communist Unity (Marxist–Leninist) (Icelandic: Einingarsamtök kommúnista (marx-lenínistar)) was an Icelandic Maoist Party formed in the late 1973, mainly by Icelandic student who had studied in Norway. The party viciously opposed what it deemed Soviet social-imperialism as well as American imperialism, opposed other Icelandic communist parties which it found to be revisionist and held a staunchly pro-China line, until the Sino-Albanian split, when it sided with Albania. The party's chairman was Ari Trausti Guðmundsson.

In 1979 the party was integrated into the Communist Union (Kommúnistasamtökin) together with the other Icelandic Maoist party, the Communist Party of Iceland (Marxist–Leninist) (Kommúnistaflokkur Íslands (m-l)).

From 1975 to 1985 Communist Unity published the newspaper Verkalýðsblaðið (the working people's paper).

The party maintained fraternal relations with Workers' Communist Party (Norway), Communist Party of Germany/Marxists–Leninists, Marxist–Leninist League of Denmark, Communist Party of Sweden, amongst other parties.

References

External links
Verkalýðsblaðið Archive

Anti-revisionist organizations
Defunct political parties in Iceland
Communist parties in Iceland
Maoist organizations in Europe
Political parties established in the 1970s
1970s establishments in Iceland
Political parties disestablished in the 1980s
1980s disestablishments in Iceland